Aubyn Bernard Rochfort Trevor-Battye, MA, MBOU, FLS, FRGS, FZS (17 July 1855 – 19/20 December 1922) was a British traveller, naturalist and writer.

He was born at Hever, Kent, where his father, the Reverend William Wilberforce Battye, was rector. His mother was daughter of Edmund Wakefield Meade-Waldo, resident of Hever Castle. The Rev. W.W. Battye was a descendant of Sir John Trevor (1626-1672) and inherited Trevor estates in 1883. Upon his death in 1890 his surviving family took the heraldic arms of Trevor and the surname Trevor-Battye.

After graduating from Christ Church, Oxford, in 1887, Aubyn Trevor-Battye travelled widely in North America and Europe, studying ornithology, shooting game and fishing. In 1894 he made an expedition to the Russian island of Kolguyev in the Barents Sea to study its natural history, especially the birds, and the topography (Trevor-Battye 1895). He and his assistant had to make a long unplanned return through northern Russia as winter closed in, an adventure that brought Trevor-Battye to prominence on his return to Britain (Trevor-Battye 1898). He was then invited to join William Martin Conway's expedition to Spitsbergen in 1896, as their zoologist.

During a period devoted to writing and editing he married Margaret Amy Graham on 1 May 1901. He later resumed his travels and studies of natural history. He travelled extensively in Europe, often on collecting expeditions or visiting zoological gardens. He made two visits to southern Africa (1905 and 1910), and explored Crete in 1908 and a second time, probably 1909 (Trevor-Battye 1913). In 1914 he travelled in India, Nepal and Sikkim in company with Henry John Elwes.

After the 1914-1918 War he resumed his writing and editing, but due to deteriorating health he moved to the Canary Islands. He died there, at Las Palmas, on the 19th or 20 December 1922, aged 67.

He published four books of his own and a chapter in the Spitsbergen report (Trevor-Battye 1897) and over 20 papers in learned journals, mainly about ornithology. He was Editor to the Natural History section of the Victoria History of the Counties of England series (c. 1899-1902) and he edited some writings of his friend Lord Lilford (Trevor-Battye 1903). Other publications included short stories and popular articles and he edited many other articles.

Biographies
 
 Horder, M (1974) "Trevor-Battye: a Victorian in the Arctic".  The Cornhill Magazine, no 1079: 228-237.
 
 Evans, M.H. (2005) "Aubyn B.R. Trevor-Battye, 1855-1922". Unpublished annotated biography, typescript copies at the Royal Geographical Society, Christ Church (Oxford) and the Scott Polar Research Institute.
 Oxford Dictionary of National Biography:  "Battye, Aubyn Bernard Rochfort Trevor-"
 Obituary: "First explorer of Kolguev. Death of Mr Trevor-Battye". The Times Dec 22, 1922, p. 12.
 Obituary: "Aubyn Trevor-Battye".  Geographical Journal 61 (3), 229-230, March 1923.
 Obituary: "Aubyn Bernard Rochfort Trevor-Battye".  Ibis 332-334, 1923.
 Obituary: "Aubyn Bernard Rochfort Trevor-Battye".  The Avicultural Magazine 4th ser, 1 p. 9, 1923.

References

 Trevor-Battye, Aubyn (1894) Pictures in prose, Longmans Green, London
 Trevor-Battye, Aubyn (1895) Ice-bound on Kolguev, Constable, London
 Trevor-Battye, Aubyn (1897) "Report upon Ekman Bay and Dickson Bay", in: The first crossing of Spitsbergen by Sir William Martin Conway, Dent, London
 Trevor-Battye, Aubyn (1898) A northern highway of the Tsar, Constable, London
 Trevor-Battye, Aubyn (ed.) (1903) Lord Lilford on birds, Hutchinson, London
 Trevor-Battye, Aubyn (1913) Camping in Crete, Witherby, London

1855 births
1922 deaths
Alumni of Christ Church, Oxford
English Anglicans
English writers
Fellows of the Linnean Society of London
Fellows of the Royal Geographical Society
Fellows of the Zoological Society of London
English naturalists
People from Hever, Kent
Contributors to the Victoria County History